Euseius ugandaensis is a species of mite in the family Phytoseiidae.

References

ugandaensis
Articles created by Qbugbot